The Wedding March (Italian: La marcia nuziale) is a 1934 Italian comedy film directed by Mario Bonnard and starring Tullio Carminati, Cesare Bettarini, and Assia Noris.

The film's sets were designed by the art director Gastone Medin.

A French-language version with Madeleine Renaud was also released.

Cast

See also
 The Wedding March (1915)
 The Wedding March (1929)

References

Bibliography
 Goble, Alan. The Complete Index to Literary Sources in Film. Walter de Gruyter, 1999.

External links

1934 films
1930s Italian-language films
Films directed by Mario Bonnard
1934 comedy films
Italian comedy films
Italian black-and-white films
Italian multilingual films
Sound film remakes of silent films
Italian films based on plays
1934 multilingual films
1930s Italian films